Thomas Hinckley Bond (January 14, 1804 – May 27, 1882) was an American politician.

Bond, younger son of Dr. Solomon and Sally (Hinckley) Bond, was born in Enfield, Conn., January 14, 1804.

He graduated Yale College in 1825.  He studied law in the Yale Law School for three years, but before beginning practice invested his entire patrimony in a manufacturing enterprise in Waterbury, Conn., by the failure of which within a year he was left a poor man. He then settled in the practice of law in Pittsburgh, Pa., but in 1831 removed to Oswego, N. Y., where he resided for twenty-three years engaged in the milling and flouring business, being also for some time collector of the port, and a New York State Senator.

In 1854, having accumulated a handsome property, he retired from business, and after a year spent in Europe returned to New Haven, Conn., where he continued until his death. He became politically prominent in Connecticut, serving in both branches of the Connecticut State Legislature, and in 1864 and 1865 being the Democratic candidate for lieutenant governor.  He died in New Haven, May 27, 1882, having been an invalid for seven years from disease of the spine and of the kidneys.

He was twice married, his first wife being Elizabeth, daughter of Capt. James Goodrich, of New Haven, by whom he had a son, and a daughter, both of whom survived him.  In June 1869, he married Mary E, daughter of the Hon. Royal R. Hinman, who survived him.

External links

1804 births
1882 deaths
People from Enfield, Connecticut
Yale Law School alumni
Pennsylvania lawyers
New York (state) state senators
Connecticut state senators
Members of the Connecticut House of Representatives
19th-century American politicians
Yale College alumni
19th-century American lawyers